Plaza Rakyat LRT station is an elevated rapid transit station in central Kuala Lumpur, Malaysia.

History
The station is named after and located at the rear of Plaza Rakyat, a large mixed-use development project that was stalled during the economic crisis in 1997. Due to its proximity with Plaza Rakyat as it was opened, the concourse level of the Plaza Rakyat station was originally intended to directly link the south side of the complex.

With Plaza Rakyat incomplete, a 150-metre-long covered pedestrian bridge and walkway was provided to connect the station to the south of the nearby Pudu Sentral bus station. Due to the suspension of the construction project, the pedestrian bridge continues to serve passengers entering and leaving the station until now.

The station is located near the site of the old Sultan Street railway station.

Connection to MRT Kajang Line
The Plaza Rakyat LRT station is an interchange station with Merdeka MRT station since 17 July 2017. It was initially meant to be only a connecting station without paid zone-to-paid zone integration, but a later update included paid zone-to-paid zone integration, where commuters do not need to tap out and purchase new tickets to transit to the other line. A covered and air-conditioned 180 metres pedestrian walkway was built, connecting the paid-area concourses of the two stations.

Station layout

The station was constructed in a significantly different style from a standard  and  station. Whereas a typical  and  station consists of a dedicated structure of a similar style of white facades and roofs supported by latticework, the station is embedded into the Plaza Rakyat project, with thick, untreated concrete pillars and ceilings, and exposed pipes. Curved sheets were added and pillars were painted to soften the rough appearance of the station's interior.

The platforms of the station are linked via escalators and stairways to a single concourse area just below the rapid transit line, where tickets are purchased. There is lift facilities in this station.

Around the station
 Stadium Negara
 Victoria Institution (also served by  Hang Tuah LRT/Monorail)
 Maybank Tower
 Petaling Street
 Pudu Sentral
 Confucian Private Secondary School
 Methodist Boys' School

See also

 List of rail transit stations in Klang Valley

Ampang Line
Railway stations opened in 1996
1996 establishments in Malaysia